Jason Nahrung (born 1968) is an Australian horror author and journalist who lives in Melbourne with his partner Kirstyn McDermott. Nahrung has previously written for The Courier-Mail newspaper in Queensland, with a special interest in speculative fiction and horror-related topics. He was co-winner the 2005 William Atheling Jnr award for Criticism or Review. His first novel, The Darkness Within (based on an unpublished novella co-written with Mil Clayton), was published in June 2007 by Hachette Livre in Australia. Nahrung has also published some horror and speculative fiction short stories.

Bibliography

Novels
 The Darkness Within – with Mil Clayton, (Hachette Livre)
Salvage, 2012, (Twelfth Planet Press)
Blood and Dust, 2012, (Xoum Publishing)

Short stories
"Watermarks", (2014), Cosmos magazine.
"The Preservation Society", (2014), Dimension6, Coeur de Lion.
"The Mornington Ride", (2012), Epilogue, Tehani Wessely (FableCroft Publishing).
reprinted in Focus 2012: highlights of Australian short fiction, (2013), FableCroft Publishing.
"Hello Kitty", (2012), Midnight Echo No. 8.
"The Last Boat to Eden", (2012), Surviving the End, Dark Prints Press.
reprinted in Year's Best Australian Fantasy and Horror 2012, (2013), Ticonderoga Publications.
"The Kiss", (2012), Tales from the Bell Club.
"Breaking the Wire", (2012), Aurealis" No. 47.
"An Incident at Portsea, 1967", (2011), After the World: Corpus Christi, Issue 4.
"Messiah on the Rock", (2011), Anywhere but Earth, Coeur de Lion.
"Children of the Cane", (2011), Dead Red Heart, Ticonderoga Publications.
"Wraiths", (2011), Winds of Change, CSFG.
reprinted in Year’s Best Australian Dark Fantasy and Horror 2011, (2012), Ticonderoga Publications.
"Resurrection in Red", (2011), More Scary Kisses, Ticonderoga Publications.
"Wet Work", (2011), After the Rain, ed. Tehani Wessely (FableCroft Publishing).
 "Smoking, Waiting for the Dawn", (2008), Dreaming Again, HarperVoyager.
 "The Refugee", (2007), Fantastical Journeys to Brisbane.
 "Kadimakara and Curlew", (2007), Daikaiju 2, Agog! Press.
reprinted in Australian Dark Fantasy and Horror Vol.3.
 "Pain Threshold", (2006), Agog! Ripping Reads, Agog! Press.
 reprinted in Australian Dark Fantasy & Horror 2007 (Brimstone Press)
 "Time to Write", (2005) The Devil in Brisbane.
 "Triage", (2005), Sf-envision.
 "Night Watch", (2005), Elsewhere, CSFG Publishing.
 "Spare Parts", (2003), Glimpses.
reprinted in Devil Dolls and Duplicates in Australian Horror (2011).
 "Prime Cuts", (2002), Antipodean SF.
 "Summer Haze", (2001), Visions.

Awards
Wins
2012 Chronos Award: Best Novel for Salvage (Twelfth Planet Press).
2012 Chronos Award: Best Short Story for "The Mornington Ride", 'Epilogue (FableCroft Publishing).
 2005 William Atheling Jr Award: "Why are publishers afraid of horror?" (The Courier-Mail)

Nominations
2012 WSFA Small Press Award: "The Mornington Ride", Epilogue (FableCroft Publishing).
2012 Aurealis Award for best horror novel: Blood and Dust (Xoum Publishing).
2012 Aurealis Award for best horror novel: Salvage (Twelfth Planet Press).
2012 Australian Shadows Award: Blood and Dust (Xoum Publishing).
2012 Ditmar Award, Novel: Salvage (Twelfth Planet Press).
 2008 Ditmar Award, Novel: The Darkness Within
 2008 Ditmar Award, New Talent
 2004 William Atheling Jr Award

Honourable mentions
 2008 Aurealis Award, Horror novel: The Darkness Within

Reviews
 Review of The Darkness Within in Andromeda Spaceways Inflight Magazine by Tehani Wessley (August 2007)
 Review of The Darkness Within in HorrorScope by Mark Smith-Briggs (23 Aug 2007).
 Reviews of Nahrung's work on ASif!

Notes

References
 Aurealis Awards winners archive Retrieved 17 February 2008.
 The Courier-Mail newspaper list of articles by Jason Nahrung.
 Helene, Talie (June 2007). "Interview: The New Romantics". HorrorScope.
 Inkspillers Ditmar Awards archive. Retrieved 17 February 2008.
 Kemble, Gary (16 April 2006). "Jason Nahrung: the ups and downs of horror". ABC online news (Articulate).
 Kemble, Gary (9 June 2007). "Jason Nahrung and Mil Clayton: Looking on the dark side". ABC online news (Articulate).
 Locus magazine index to Ditmar Awards. Retrieved 17 February 2008.

External links
 Jason Nahrung website
 Jason Nahrung MySpace page
 Hachette Livre author page: Jason Nahrung

Twelfth Planet Press, Salvage
Goodreads, Blood and Dust

1968 births
Australian horror writers
Australian male short story writers
Living people